Bhushan Ashok Bhatt (b 1963) is an Indian politician and former member of Gujarat Legislative Assembly from Jamalpur-Khadia assembly constituency of Amdavad district. He represented the seat from 2012 to 2017, but lost the 2017 election.

His father Ashok Bhatt was a speaker of Gujarat Vidhan Sabha in 2010.

References

Living people
Bharatiya Janata Party politicians from Gujarat
Gujarat MLAs 2007–2012
1963 births
Gujarat MLAs 2012–2017